Sjølisand is a village in Rendalen Municipality in Innlandet county, Norway.

References

Rendalen
Villages in Innlandet